Isetsky (masculine), Isetskaya (feminine), or Isetskoye (neuter) may refer to:
Isetsky District, a district of Tyumen Oblast, Russia
Isetsky (rural locality) (Isetskaya, Isetskoye), several rural localities in Russia

See also
 Isetskoe (disambiguation)